Solomon 'Sol' Kerzner,  (23 August 1935 – 21 March 2020) was a South African accountant and business magnate. He founded both of South Africa's largest hotel groups, the Southern Sun Hotel Group and Sun International. He was also the Founder, Chairman, and CEO of Kerzner International. During his career in the resort industry, he was involved in various political and business controversies.

Early life and education

Kerzner was born in Durban to Russian Jewish immigrants. His family owned and operated a chain of kosher hotels. Kerzner graduated from  the University of the Witwatersrand, Johannesburg with a BCom (Hons) in Accounting, and later qualified as a Chartered Accountant. He then took control of the family company.

Career

In 1962, he purchased the Astra Hotel in Durban. Following the success of that property, Kerzner built South Africa's first five-star graded hotel in Umhlanga, a town north of Durban – he opened this resort in December 1964 which he named the Beverly Hills Hotel.

Following the Beverly Hills, Kerzner built the 450-room Elangeni Hotel (now renamed Southern Sun Elangeni & Maharani), overlooking Durban's beachfront and, in 1969, in partnership with South African Breweries, he established the chain of Southern Sun Hotels, which by 1983 operated 30 luxury hotels with more than 7,000 rooms. In 1975, Kerzner opened his first hotel outside South Africa on the Indian Ocean island of Mauritius, which he named Le Saint Géran.

Sun City 

In 1979, Kerzner developed Sun City, the most ambitious resort project in Africa. Over a period of ten years he built four hotels, a man-made lake, two Gary Player designed championship golf courses, and an entertainment center with an indoor 6,000-seat multi-purpose arena at which he presented many superstars including Frank Sinatra, Liza Minnelli, Queen and Shirley Bassey. The arena was also the venue of many World Title fights promoted by Bob Arum. In 1985, Kerzner's Sun City, South Africa resort was the topic of anti-Apartheid rock album titled Sun City by a group of rock musicians calling themselves Artists United Against Apartheid.

In 1994, following the first multiracial elections in South Africa, Kerzner was asked by incoming President Nelson Mandela to arrange the VIP function at the Presidential Inauguration, which was attended by approximately a thousand people, including many of the world's leaders and heads of state.

Mohegan Sun 

In 1996, Kerzner opened the Mohegan Sun casino in Uncasville, Connecticut. In 2000, a second phase of the project was opened including a 1,200-room hotel through a joint venture with the Mohegan Tribe of Connecticut called Trading Cove Associates. TCA relinquished its management of the resort in 2002, but Kerzner through his company received a 5% dividend on the gross revenue generated by Mohegan Sun until 2014. The property is one of the largest gambling and entertainment complexes in the United States.

Later career 

As a result of the success of the Sun City Resort with its Gary Player Country Club golf course (ranked number 1 in South Africa), he became involved in an international hotel, leisure and gambling resorts: most notably for his role as the developer behind the Atlantis Resort in The Bahamas. In that capacity, in late 1994, Kerzner made his first major acquisition outside Africa with the purchase of the Paradise Island Resort in The Bahamas. This 1,150-room resort was in bankruptcy at the time. After acquiring the resort, Kerzner launched a re-development and expansion programme. It transformed Paradise Island into a 2,300-room resort; that included one of the world's grandest artificial marine habitats and the Caribbean's biggest casino.

In 2002, Kerzner launched One&Only Resorts which currently operates numerous properties in The Bahamas, Mexico, Mauritius, the Maldives, South Africa, Dubai, Rwanda and Hayman Island. New projects by the company are also planned for China, Montenegro and Saudi Arabia.

In early 2007, Kerzner expanded Atlantis, Paradise Island with 2 new hotels; The Cove, and The Reef, which added 1,100 new rooms to the property.  This expansion which was overseen by Alan Leibman, which included 21 retail outlets and new restaurants by celebrity chefs Jean-Georges Vongerichten, Nobu Matsuhisa and Bobby Flay. Kerzner extended the Atlantis brand globally with the development of Atlantis The Palm, Dubai, with 1,500-room, water-themed resort opened in late-September 2008 on The Palm Jumeirah; a multibillion-dollar leisure and residential development in Dubai. In September 2009, the "Mazagan Beach Resort" a luxury hotel in El Jadida, Morocco, was inaugurated by Kerzner accompanied by show celebrities.

In October 2013, Kerzner announced that he was building a new Atlantis hotel at Sanya, Hainan Island in China with Fosun International. The 62-hectare resort has 1,300 rooms and a water park like the other Atlantis hotels. The project is reported to have cost $1.63 billion.

Controversies, collusion and apartheid involvement 

In 1984, Kerzner made a deal with Leslie Young, the Minister of Finance for the bantustan of Bophutatswana, that any investments by his company, Sun International, that had the effect of advertising apartheid abroad, would be tax-deductible. Sun International paid next to no money for taxes in South Africa due to tax breaks.

In 1987, an agreement between Young and Kerzner stated that 90% of taxes from entertainers in Bophutatswana would go back to Sun International, with any entertainer making more than R26,000 having to pay half their income to Bophutatswana.

In 1990, Kerzner was found to have paid R5 million to the Transkeian Chief George Matanzima for gaming licenses, R2 million of which was said to be a bribe. The case surrounding this was dropped in 1997.

In 1997, Alan Greenblo was banned from publishing a biography on Kerzner, Kerzner - Unauthorized. While Kerzner wanted sections of the book to be removed, Witwatersrand Judge Monas Flemming banned it. Sections of the book were published in Noseweek the same year.

Kerzner was a contact listed in Jeffrey Epstein's "little black book", which gained attention following the conviction and death of Epstein, who was a convicted sex offender.

Personal life

Kerzner was married four times. His first wife was Maureen Adler and together they had three children: Butch Kerzner, Andrea Kerzner and Beverly Kerzner Mace. His second wife was Shirley Bestbier; they had two children: Brandon Kerzner and Chantal Kerzner Sweeney. She later committed suicide soon after the birth of her second child.

His marriage to his third wife, Miss World 1974 Anneline Kriel, ended in divorce after five years. During a lengthy period in the 1990s, he dated the model Christina Estrada and got engaged, but never married her. He married his fourth wife, Heather Murphy in 2000 and they divorced in 2011.

Kerzner's son, Howard "Butch" Kerzner died on 11 October 2006 when the helicopter he was travelling in crashed near Sosua, in the Puerto Plata province of the Dominican Republic. He left behind his wife, Vanessa Kerzner, and two children Tai and Kailin. Sol Kerzner's daughter, Andrea, is the founder and CEO of Lalela, a charity dedicated to bringing the arts to at-risk youth in South Africa.

Kerzner was awarded the Lifetime Achievement Award for his contributions to the industry during the International Hotel Investment Forum (IHIF) in March 2019.

Kerzner was appointed an honorary Knight Commander of the Order of St Michael and St George, which allowed him to have the postnominal letters 'K.C.M.G.' after his name - but not the prenominal title of 'Sir' before his name, as he was not a citizen of a Commonwealth realm or the U.K. at the time of his honour being conferred.

Death

Kerzner died of cancer on 21 March 2020 in Cape Town.

References

External links 

 Kerzner International

1935 births
2020 deaths
Honorary Knights Commander of the Order of St Michael and St George
People from Johannesburg
South African businesspeople
South African Jews
White South African people
South African people of Russian-Jewish descent
University of the Witwatersrand alumni
Deaths from cancer in South Africa